Paul Seabury (May 6, 1923 – October 17, 1990) was an American political scientist and foreign policy consultant.

Life
Born in Hempstead, Long Island, Seabury was a native New Yorker. He graduated from Swarthmore College in 1946, and from Columbia University with a Ph.D. He taught at University of California, Berkeley starting in 1953. Once a national official of the liberal Americans for Democratic Action, after the tumultuous era of student revolt at Berkeley, he became a leading spokesman for the first American neo-conservatives. He was part of the Consortium for the Study of Intelligence, which fostered intelligence studies in American universities. He served on the President's Foreign Intelligence Advisory Board during the Reagan Administration. He married Marie-Anne Phelps; they had two sons. His papers are held at the Hoover Institution. He died in Pinole, California.

Seabury was a great player of croquet, and edited a book on the game for Abercrombie and Fitch.

Awards
 1964 Bancroft Prize
 1961-62 Guggenheim Fellowship

Works
"The Banality of Liberalism", The New York Review of Books, November 11, 1965

"Trendier than thou: the many temptations of the Episcopal Church", Harper's Magazine, 1978
 The Wilhelmstrasse, University of California Press, 1954
 Power, Freedom, and Diplomacy, Random House, 1963
 The Balance of Power, Chandler Pub. Co., 1965
 The Rise and Decline of the Cold War, Basic Books, 1967
 
 
    (2nd edition Brassey's, 2006)

References

Swarthmore College alumni
Columbia University alumni
University of California, Berkeley faculty
1923 births
1990 deaths
20th-century American historians
American male non-fiction writers
People from Hempstead (village), New York
Historians from New York (state)
Bancroft Prize winners
Historians from California
20th-century American male writers